Madurasinghe Arachchige Wijayasiri Ranjith Madurasinghe (born 30 January 1961), or Ranjith Madurasinghe, is a former Sri Lankan cricketer, who played three Test matches and twelve One Day Internationals for Sri Lanka between 1988 and 1992. He was a right-arm off break bowler and a left-handed batsman.

Madurasinghe was educated at Maliyadeva College, Kurunegala, and played domestically for Kurunegala Youth Cricket Club. 
After retiring, he became a referee.

External links

1961 births
Living people
Sri Lanka One Day International cricketers
Sri Lanka Test cricketers
Sri Lankan cricketers
Wayamba cricketers
Alumni of Maliyadeva College
Sportspeople from Kurunegala